The Alesha-class minelayers, known in the USSR as Project 317, was a designation for a class of three ships used by the Soviet Navy in the 1960s.

Ships 
The ships were named Pripyat, Sukhona and Vychegda, but were assigned the reporting name Alesha by NATO.

References

Minelayers
Ships of the Soviet Navy